Molybdenite is a mineral of molybdenum disulfide, MoS2. Similar in appearance and feel to graphite, molybdenite has a lubricating effect that is a consequence of its layered structure.  The atomic structure consists of a sheet of molybdenum atoms sandwiched between sheets of sulfur atoms.  The Mo-S bonds are strong, but the interaction between the sulfur atoms at the top and bottom of separate sandwich-like tri-layers is weak, resulting in easy slippage as well as  cleavage planes.
Molybdenite crystallizes in the hexagonal crystal system as the common polytype 2H and also in the trigonal system as the 3R polytype.

Description

Occurrence

Molybdenite occurs in high temperature hydrothermal ore deposits.
Its associated minerals include pyrite, chalcopyrite, quartz, anhydrite, fluorite, and scheelite.  Important deposits include the disseminated porphyry molybdenum deposits at Questa, New Mexico and the Henderson and Climax mines in Colorado. Molybdenite also occurs in porphyry copper deposits of Arizona, Utah, and Mexico.

The element rhenium is always present in molybdenite as a substitute for molybdenum, usually in the parts per million (ppm) range, but often up to 1–2%. High rhenium content results in a structural variety detectable by X-ray diffraction techniques.  Molybdenite ores are essentially the only source for rhenium.  The presence of the radioactive isotope rhenium-187 and its daughter isotope osmium-187 provides a useful geochronologic dating technique.

Features

Molybdenite is extremely soft with a metallic luster, and is superficially almost identical to graphite, to the point where it is not possible to positively distinguish between the two minerals without scientific equipment. It marks paper in much the same way as graphite. Its distinguishing feature from graphite is its higher specific gravity, as well as its tendency to occur in a matrix.

Uses
Molybdenite is an important ore of molybdenum, and is the most common source of the metal.  While molybdenum is rare in the Earth's crust, molybdenite is relatively common and easy to process, and accounts for much of the metal's economic viability. Molybdenite is purified by froth flotation, and then oxidized to form soluble molybdate. Reduction of ammonium molybdate yields pure molybdenum metal, which is used for fertilizer, as a catalyst, and in battery electrodes. By far the most common use of molybdenum is as an alloy with iron. Ferromolybdenum is an important component of high strength and corrosion-resistant steel.

Semiconductor
Multilayer molybdenite flakes are semiconductors with an indirect bandgap. In contrast, monolayer flakes have a direct gap.  In the early years of the 20th century, molybdenite was used in some of the first crude semiconductor diodes, called cat's whisker detectors, which served as a demodulator in early crystal radios.    Monolayer molybdenite shows good charge carrier mobility and can be used to create small or low-voltage transistors.  The transistors can detect and emit light and may have future use in optoelectronics.

See also
Powellite (calcium molybdate:  CaMoO4)
Rheniite (rhenium sulfide: ReS2)
Wulfenite (lead molybdate: PbMoO4)

References

External links 

Sulfide minerals
Molybdenum minerals
Non-petroleum based lubricants
Dry lubricants
Trigonal minerals
Minerals in space group 160
Hexagonal minerals
Minerals in space group 194
Semiconductor materials